The Story of Light may refer to:

The Story of Light (Steve Vai album), 2012
The Story of Light (Shinee album), 2018